Finucane Island is located adjacent to Port Hedland in the Pilbara region of Western Australia.

References

Islands of the Pilbara